Snover is an unincorporated community and census-designated place in Moore Township, Sanilac County, Michigan, United States. Its population was 448 as of the 2010 census. Snover has a post office with ZIP code 48472. The community was named for Horace G. Snover, who represented the area in Congress from 1895 to 1898.

Geography

Demographics

References

Unincorporated communities in Sanilac County, Michigan
Unincorporated communities in Michigan
Census-designated places in Sanilac County, Michigan
Census-designated places in Michigan